Maria Olegovna Borisova (born 28 July 1997) is a Russian female water polo player. She was part of the Russia women's national water polo team. 

She competed at the 2014 Women's European Water Polo Championship, and the 2016 Summer Olympics.

She plays for traditional water polo club Ethnikos Piraeus in Greece.

See also
 List of Olympic medalists in water polo (women)
 List of World Aquatics Championships medalists in water polo

References

External links
 

1997 births
Living people
Russian female water polo players
Place of birth missing (living people)
Water polo players at the 2016 Summer Olympics
Olympic water polo players of Russia
Olympic bronze medalists for Russia
Olympic medalists in water polo
Medalists at the 2016 Summer Olympics
World Aquatics Championships medalists in water polo

Ethnikos Piraeus Water Polo Club players
21st-century Russian women